Under a Raging Moon may refer to:
 Under a Raging Moon (album), a 1985 album by Roger Daltrey
 "Under a Raging Moon" (song), a song by Roger Daltrey